The Annapolis Basin is a sub-basin of the Bay of Fundy, located on the bay's southeastern shores, along the northwestern shore of Nova Scotia and at the western end of the Annapolis Valley.

The basin takes its name from the Annapolis River, which drains into its eastern end at the town of Annapolis Royal.

It is a sheltered and mostly shallow water body, framed by the ridges of the North Mountain and South Mountain ranges of the Annapolis Valley; the basin is geologically a continuation of the valley floor.  A break in the North Mountain range at the northwestern edge of the basin, called Digby Gut, provides an outlet to the Bay of Fundy.

The Bay Ferries Limited ferry service operating across the Bay of Fundy between Digby and Saint John maintains a terminal on the western shore of the basin near the Digby Gut.

Rivers
Rivers which drain into the basin include:
 Annapolis River
 Bear River
 Moose River

Islands
Two major islands are located in the basin:
 Bear Island
 Goat Island

Communities

The basin hosts several historic seaports, including:

 Towns of Annapolis Royal and Digby
 Village of Bear River
 Communities of Granville Ferry, Port Royal, Port Wade, Victoria Beach, Clementsport, Deep Brook, and Smiths Cove

A former Royal Canadian Navy base and decommissioned Canadian Forces Base is located between Deep Brook and Clementsport on the southeast shore of the basin - see CFB Cornwallis.

Bays of Nova Scotia
Landforms of Annapolis County, Nova Scotia
Landforms of Digby County, Nova Scotia